Juhani Uolevi Pallasmaa (born 14 September 1936 in Hämeenlinna, Finland) is a Finnish architect and former professor of architecture and dean at the Helsinki University of Technology. Among the many academic and civic positions he has held are those of Director of the Museum of Finnish Architecture 1978–1983, and head of the Institute of Industrial Arts, Helsinki. He established his own architect's office – Arkkitehtitoimisto Juhani Pallasmaa KY – in 1983 in Helsinki. From 2001 to 2003, he was Raymond E. Maritz Visiting Professor of Architecture at Washington University in St. Louis, and in 2013 he received an honorary doctorate from that university. In 2010–2011, Pallasmaa served as Plym Distinguished Professor at the University of Illinois Urbana-Champaign, and in 2012-2013 he was scholar in residence at Frank Lloyd Wright's Taliesin. Pallasmaa has also lectured widely in Europe, North and South America, Africa and Asia.

His exhibitions of Finnish architecture, planning and visual arts have been displayed in more than thirty countries and he has written numerous articles on cultural philosophy, environmental psychology and theories of architecture and the arts. Many of his articles are first featured in ARK (The Finnish Architectural Review).

Among Pallasmaa's many books on architectural theory is The Eyes of the Skin – Architecture and the Senses, a book that has become a classic of architectural theory and is required reading on courses in many schools of architecture around the world.

A selection of essays written by Pallasmaa, from the early years to more recent ones, has been translated into English and collated together in the book Encounters – Architectural Essays (Helsinki, 2005), edited by Peter MacKeith. The book was shortlisted for the RIBA 2005 International Book Award.

In 2006 Pallasmaa turned 70, and the occasion was marked by the publication of the book Archipelago. Essays on Architecture, edited by Peter MacKeith. The collection contains essays by 23 authors, all with some connection to Pallasmaa or MacKeith. They include: Karsten Harries, Dan Hoffman, Steven Holl, Colin St. John Wilson and Daniel Libeskind.

Pallasmaa is a member of the Finnish Association of Architects, and an honorary Fellow of the American Institute of Architects.  During the spring of 2010, Pallasmaa, along with American playwright Leigh Fondakowski, was an Imagine Fund Distinguished Visiting Chair at the Institute for Advanced Study at University of Minnesota. Pallasmaa was jury member for the 2014 Pritzker Architecture Prize and The Daylight Award in 2020 and 2022.

Architectural career

In terms of architectural production, the work Juhani Pallasmaa has undergone a shift during his career. His early career is characterised by concerns with rationalism, standardization and prefabrication. This was partly due to the influence of his mentor Professor Aulis Blomstedt, who was very much concerned with proportional systems and standardization. Pallasmaa's first key work demonstrating these principles was the Moduli 225 (with Kristian Gullichsen), an industrial-produced summer house, 1969–1971, of which around six were built in Finland. However, the key models for this type of architecture were both Japanese architecture and the refined abstractions of Ludwig Mies van der Rohe. In Finland this type of architecture is referred to as "constructivism" – with only a family resemblance to the avant-gardist Russian Constructivism – and at that time, the late 1950s and 1960s, stood in opposition to the work of Alvar Aalto, who was increasingly seen in his home country as an idiosyncratic individualist. But the interest in Japan also contained the seeds for Pallasmaa's later concerns; materiality and a phenomenology of experience. It was after returning from teaching in Africa that Pallasmaa turned away from pure constructivism, and took up his concerns with psychology, culture, and phenomenology. His concern for details and small works such as exhibition design has sometimes earned him the label "jewel-box architect". 2006 saw the completion of his largest ever work, the Kamppi Center, incorporating the main bus station, a shopping centre and housing in central Helsinki, though the work was split up into different sections involving various architects, and overall design was under the control of architects Helin & Co.

A selection of architectural works designed by Juhani Pallasmaa
 Kamppi Centre (under the direction of architects Helin & Co), Helsinki, 2003–2006.
 Snow Show, Lapland (with Rachel Whiteread), 2004.
 Bank of Finland Museum, Helsinki, 2002–2003.
 Pedestrian and cycle bridge, Viikki Eco-village, Helsinki, 2002.
 Cranbrook Academy of Art, Driveway Square, Bloomfield Hills, Michigan, 1994.
 Itäkeskus Shopping Centre, Helsinki; major extension, glass covered boulevard (interior, bridge and kiosk structures, street furniture, advertising systems) 1989–91.
 Ruoholahti Residential Area, Helsinki: design of outdoor spaces (canal, parks, bridges, materials, lighting, street furniture, etc.), 1990–91.
 Institut Finlandais (with Roland Schweitzer), 60, Rue des Ecoles, Paris, 1986–91.
 Helsinki Telephone Association, phone booth design, 1987.
 Helsinki Old Market Hall, Helsinki, renovation 1986.
 Art Museum, Rovaniemi, renovation, 1984–86.
 Summer atelier of artist Tor Arne, Vänö Island, 1970.
 Moduli 225 (with Kristian Gullichsen), model industrial summer house, 1969–1971.

Quotes
 "The door handle is the handshake of the building" (Juhani Pallasmaa, The Eyes of the Skin: Architecture and the Senses)
 "I see the task of architecture as the defense of the authenticity of human experience" (Juhani Pallasmaa, Encounters)
 "Juhani Pallasmaa, a man from the extreme north, who has a dynamic cosmopolitan personality and is deeply in love with Italy." (Stefano Tessadori)
 "The house is a mental device and filter as much as it is a protection for our fragile bodies" (Robinson, Sarah. Nesting: Body, Dwelling, Mind. Richmond"

Exhibitions
 "Studies in Silence" exhibition of Pallasmaa's works at Valcucine Milano Brera, Milan, Italy, March 2014.

Awards
2014 Schelling Architecture Theory Prize
1999 Jean Tschumi Prize for architectural criticism

See also
 Architecture of Finland
 Phenomenology (architecture)

References

Bibliography
Pallasmaa has published two dozen books and over 300 essays in 30 languages. Some of his best known publications include:

 Juhani Pallasmaa, Understanding Architecture, Phaidon, 2012.
 Juhani Pallasmaa, Encounters 2 – Architectural Essays. Edited by Peter MacKeith. Rakennustieto: Helsinki, 2012.
 Juhani Pallasmaa, The Thinking Hand, John Wiley, 2009.
 Juhani Pallasmaa, Archipelago. Essays on Architecture. Edited by Peter MacKeith, Rakennustieto: Helsinki, 2006.
 Juhani Pallasmaa, Encounters. Architectural Essays. Edited by Peter MacKeith. Rakennustieto: Helsinki, 2005.
 Juhani Pallasmaa, The Eyes of the Skin. Architecture and the Senses. Polemic, Academy Editions: London, 1996.
 Juhani Pallasmaa, The Architecture of Image: Existential Space in Cinema. Rakennustieto: Helsinki, 2001.
 Roger Connah, The Piglet Years. The Lost Militancy in Finnish Architecture. Datutop: Tampere, 2007.
 Ginés Garrido, in collaboration with Juhani Pallasmaa, Konstantin Melnikov [DVD]: La casa de Melnikov: la utopia de Moscu. Barcelona: Fundación Caja de Arquitectos, 2009.
 Juhani Pallasmaa, The Embodied Image. Wiley & Sons Publishers: Chichester, 2011.

External links

 AGORA LECTURE 2012 Turku Agora Lecture.
http://www2.uiah.fi/opintoasiat/history2/pallas.htm
 PALLASMAA Juhani Uolevi International Who's Who. accessed 1 September 2006.

1936 births
Living people
People from Hämeenlinna
20th-century Finnish architects
Modernist architects
Finnish architecture writers
Architectural theoreticians
Washington University in St. Louis faculty
Academic staff of the Aalto University School of Arts, Design and Architecture
Academic staff of the Helsinki University of Technology